Anegleis cardoni, is a species of lady beetle found in India, Pakistan and Sri Lanka.

Description
It is a medium-sized lady beetle. Body bright yellow with one black median stripe at the joint of both the elytra.

Biology
It is known to feed on a many species of aphids such as: Uroleucon compositae, Rhopalosiphum maidis, Hyadaphis coriandri, Myzus persicae, Brevicoryne brassicae, Macrosiphum miscanthi, Macrosiphum pisi, Aphis gossypii, Aphis craccivora, and Lipaphis erysimi. In addition to aphids, it is also a predator of whiteflies and scale insects.

References 

Coccinellidae
Insects of Sri Lanka
Beetles described in 1900